Samotišky is a municipality and village in Olomouc District in the Olomouc Region of the Czech Republic. It has about 1,400 inhabitants.

Notable people
Stanislav Látal (1919–1994), puppeteer, animator and film director

References

Villages in Olomouc District